The 27th meridian west from Washington is an archaic meridian based on the Washington Meridian. The meridian is approximately 104 degrees west of the Prime Meridian. It is used as the boundary of five states.

Usage as boundary 
The usage of the meridian as a boundary began in 1863 when the Idaho Territory was created, with the 27th meridian as its eastern boundary. At that time, the Dakota Territory and the Nebraska Territory gained their western boundary as portions of those territories were made a part of Idaho Territory. Nebraska became a state in 1867. In 1868, the Wyoming Territory was created with the meridian as its eastern boundary. The Dakota Territory was divided into North and South Dakota on November 2, 1889, and Montana became a state just six days later. Wyoming became a state in 1890.

References 

Borders of Montana
Borders of Nebraska
Borders of North Dakota
Borders of South Dakota
Borders of Wyoming
Meridians (geography)